Cold Lake 149A is an Indian reserve of the Cold Lake First Nations in Alberta, located within the Municipal District of Bonnyville No. 87. It is on the south shore of Cold Lake, immediately adjacent to the city of Cold Lake.

References

Indian reserves in Alberta